The table below chronicles the achievements of Sepidrood in various competitions since 1974.

See also 
Sepidrood Rasht F.C.
Takht Jamshid Cup
Azadegan League
Iran Football's 2nd Division
Hazfi Cup

References

Iran Premier League Stats
RSSSF database about Iranian league football.

Sepidrood